Esteban Bermudez Salas (born 11 October 1995) is a Mexican professional boxer who has held the WBA (Regular) light flyweight title from May 2021 to June 2022.

Professional career
Bermudez made his professional debut against Ricardo Sanchez on March 7, 2013. He won the fight by decision. He would go on to amass a 13-3-2 record, before fighting for his first world title.

Bermudez was scheduled to fight the reigning WBA (Regular) light flyweight champion Carlos Cañizales on May 28, 2021. This was Cañizales' first title defense in over two years, having last defended the title against Sho Kimura on May 26, 2019. Bermudez entered the bout as a significant underdog, with one journalist stating Cañizales was "a class above Bermudez". Bermudez won the fight by a sixth-round knockout. He knocked down the champion near the end of the round with two overhand rights, and although Cañizales managed to beat the count, he was once again knocked down two seconds after the count.

On June 10, 2021, the WBA ordered the reigning WBA Super champion Hiroto Kyoguchi to face Bermudez in a title unification match.

Professional boxing record

See also
List of world light-flyweight boxing champions

References

External links

 

1995 births
Living people
Mexican male boxers
People from Nezahualcóyotl
Boxers from the State of Mexico
Light-flyweight boxers
World light-flyweight boxing champions
World Boxing Association champions